East Timor centavo coins were introduced in East Timor in 2003 for use alongside United States dollar banknotes and coins, which were introduced in 2000 to replace the Indonesian rupiah following the commencement of U.N. administration. One centavo is equal to one U.S. cent. Coins issued for general circulation are in denominations of 1, 5, 10, 25 and 50 centavos and feature images of local plants and animals. In 2013 a 100 centavos coin was introduced followed by a 200 centavos coin in 2017. , East Timor does not yet issue its own banknotes.

The centavo coins are minted in Lisbon by the Imprensa Nacional-Casa da Moeda, the Portuguese national mint. Unlike coins issued for the Panamanian balboa or the Ecuadorian centavo, the East Timorese coins are not identical in size to their U.S. cent counterparts.

See also
 Centavo – article about the use of centavos worldwide
 Economy of East Timor

References

External links

Banking and Payments Authority of Timor-leste

Circulating currencies
Currencies of East Timor
Economy of East Timor
Currencies introduced in 2003
2003 establishments in East Timor